The men's singles nine-ball competition at the 2013 World Games took place from 26 to 30 July at the Unidad Deportiva Alberto Galindo in Cali, Colombia.

Last 16

Last 8

References

Nine-ball - men's singles